The Rinzai school is one of three sects of Zen in Japanese Buddhism (along with Sōtō and Ōbaku). The Chinese Linji school of Chan was first transmitted to Japan by Myōan Eisai (1141 –1215). Contemporary Japanese Rinzai is derived entirely from the Ōtōkan lineage transmitted through Hakuin Ekaku (1686–1769), who is a major figure in the revival of the Rinzai tradition.

History

Rinzai is the Japanese line of the Chinese Linji school, which was founded during the Tang dynasty by Linji Yixuan (Japanese: Rinzai Gigen).

Kamakura period (1185–1333)
Though there were several attempts to establish Rinzai lines in Japan, it first took root in a lasting way through the efforts of the monk Myōan Eisai. In 1168, Myōan Eisai traveled to China, whereafter he studied Tendai for twenty years. In 1187, he went to China again, and returned to establish a Linji lineage, which is known in Japan as Rinzai. Decades later,  (1235–1308) also studied Linji teachings in China before founding the Japanese Ōtōkan lineage, the most influential and only surviving branch of Rinzai.

The time during which Rinzai Zen was established in Japan also saw the rise of the samurai to power. Along with early imperial support, Rinzai came to enjoy the patronage of this newly ascendant warrior class.

Muromachi (or Ashikaga) period (1336–1573)
During the Muromachi period, the Rinzai school was the most successful of the schools because it was favoured by the shōgun. The school may be said to have truly flowered and achieved a distinctly Japanese identity with Shūhō Myōchō (aka Daitō Kokushi 1283–1337) and Musō Soseki (1275–1351), two influential Japanese Zen masters who did not travel to China to study.

Five Mountain System

In the beginning of the Muromachi period, the  system was fully worked out. The final version contained five temples of both Kyoto and Kamakura, presided over by Nanzen-ji. A second tier of the system consisted of Ten Temples. This system was extended throughout Japan, effectively giving control to the central government, which administered this system. The monks, often well educated and skilled, were employed by the shōgun for the governing of state affairs.

Rinzai-monasteries
Not all Rinzai Zen organisations were under such strict state control. The Rinka monasteries, which were primarily located in rural areas rather than cities, had a greater degree of independence.  The Ōtōkan lineage, which centered on Daitoku-ji, also had a greater degree of freedom. It was founded by Nanpo Shōmyō, Shūhō Myōchō, and Kanzan Egen. A well-known teacher from Daitoku-ji was Ikkyū.

Another Rinka lineage was the Hotto lineage, of which Bassui Tokushō is the best-known teacher.

Tokugawa (1600–1868)
By the 18th century, the Rinzai school had entered a period of stagnation and decline. At that time, the monk Hakuin Ekaku (1686–1769) became prominent as a revitalizer and organizer of Rinzai Zen, and his vigorous methods spearheaded a long-lasting revival. Hakuin's systemization of the kōan training system serves today as the framework of formal Rinzai practice.

Hakuin and his heirs
Most Rinzai lineages pass through Hakuin Ekaku (1685-1786), the 18th century revivalist, who considered himself to be an heir of Shōju Rōnin (Dokyō Etan, 1642–1721), though Hakuin's formal dharma transmission from Shōju Rōnin entails some unanswered questions,. When he was installed as head priest of Shōin-ji in 1718, he had the title of Dai-ichiza, "First Monk":

Another influential figure in the 18th century Rinzai revival was Tōrei Enji (1721–1792), a major student of Hakuin and an influential author, painter and calligrapher. He is the author of the influential The Undying Lamp of Zen (Shūmon mujintō ron), which presents a comprehensive system of Rinzai training.

All contemporary Rinzai-lineages stem from Inzan Ien (1751–1814) and Takujū Kosen (1760–1833), both students of Gasan Jitō (1727–1797). Gasan is considered to be a dharma heir of Hakuin, though "he did not belong to the close circle of disciples and was probably not even one of Hakuin's dharma heirs".

Through Hakuin, all contemporary Japanese Rinzai-lineages are part of the Ōtōkan lineage, brought to Japan in 1267 by Nanpo Jomyo, who received his dharma transmission in China in 1265.

Meiji Restoration (1868–1912) and Imperial Expansionism (1912–1945)
During the Meiji period (1868–1912), after a coup in 1868, Japan abandoned its feudal system and opened up to Western modernism.  Shinto became the state religion, and Buddhism adapted to the new regime. Within the Buddhist establishment the Western world was seen as a threat, but also as a challenge to stand up to.

A Rinzai university was founded in 1872, Hanazono University, initially as a seminary for those entering the priesthood. Hanazono University has grown to become the major Rinzai higher education institution in Japan.

Post-war (1945–present)
Modern Rinzai Zen is made up of 15 sects or branches. 

Some influential modern Rinzai figures include Ōmori Sōgen (大森 曹玄, 1904–1994), Sōkō Morinaga (盛永 宗興, 1925–1995), Shodo Harada (原田 正道), Eshin Nishimura (西村 惠信; born 1933), Keidō Fukushima (福島 慶道, 1933 – 2011) and D.T. Suzuki (鈴木 大拙 貞太郎, 1870–1966).

Literary Sources 

Rinzai is a Mahayana Buddhist tradition which draws from the various Indian Mahayana sutras (like the Diamond Sutra and the Heart Sutra) and shastras (treatises) of the Indian masters. Apart from this, Rinzai also closely studies the works of the Chinese Chan tradition, particularly that of the masters of the Linji school like Linji Yixuan (d. 866) and Dahui Zonggao (1089–1163) and various traditional records of that school, like the Transmission of the Lamp, and the Línjì yǔlù (臨濟語錄; Jp: Rinzai-goroku, the Record of Linji). 

Important Japanese sources of the Rinzai school include the works of Hakuin Ekaku and his student Tōrei Enji. Torei's Undying Lamp of Zen (Shūmon mujintō ron) presents a comprehensive Rinzai path as it existed at the time of Hakuin and is a major source for Rinzai Zen practice. A more modern overview of Japanese Rinzai praxis is Omori Sogen's Sanzen Nyumon (An Introduction to Zen Training).

Practice

Rinzai Zen is marked by the emphasis it places on kenshō (見性, "seeing one's true nature" or "to see clearly into the buddha-nature") as the gateway to authentic Buddhist practice. Rinzai also stresses the importance of post-kensho spiritual training which allows one to actualize awakening and embody it for the benefit of all beings. 

Another central element of Rinzai Zen practice is the student's relationship with a Zen teacher, which includes the formal practice of sanzen, a private interview between student and master and the various methods of "direct pointing" which are used by Rinzai masters to guide the student to the experience of kensho.

Formal Rinzai training focuses on zazen (seated meditation). Various practices such as different forms of breath meditation (such as breath counting, diaphragmatic breathing and tanden breath cultivation), kōan introspection, wato, and mantra practice (such as using the mantric syllable Ah) are used in zazen. Various other non-seated practices like walking meditation (Jp. kinhin), ōryōki (a meditative meal practice), and samu (physical work done with mindfulness) are a part of rinzai zen cultivation. The practicing of chanting (okyo) Buddhist sutras or dharanis is also a major element of Rinzai practice.

When engaged in formal zazen, kōans are a common object of meditation, while shikantaza ("just sitting") is less emphasized in rinzai, but still used. This contrasts with Sōtō practice, which has de-emphasized kōans since Gentō Sokuchū (circa 1800), and instead emphasizes shikantaza.

The Rinzai school developed its own formalized style of kōan introspection and training. This includes a standardized curriculum of kōans, which must be studied and "passed" in sequence. This process may include standardized questions (sassho) and common sets of "capping phrases" (jakugo) or poetry citations that are memorized by students as answers. A student's understanding of a kōan is presented to the teacher in a private interview (dokusan, daisan, or sanzen) and the teacher's job is to guide the student to kensho, in part by judging the student's kyōgai. Kōan-inquiry may be practiced during zazen (sitting meditation), kinhin (walking meditation), and throughout all daily activities.

In general, the Rinzai school is known for the rigor and severity of its training methods. The Rinzai style may be characterized as somewhat martial or sharp (following in the spirit of Linji Yixuan). Since the adoption of rinzai zen by the Hōjō clan in the 13th century, some rinzai figures have even developed the samurai arts (budō) within a zen framework. One influential figure was the Rinzai priest Takuan Sōhō who was well known for his writings on zen and budō addressed to the samurai class (see The Unfettered Mind). In this regard, Rinzai is often contrasted with another sect of zen deeply established in Japan, Sōtō, which has been called more gentle and even rustic in spirit.  A Japanese saying reflects these perceptions:  "Rinzai for the Shōgun, Sōtō for the peasants" (臨済将軍、曹洞土民, Rinzai Shōgun, Sōtō Domin).

The Rinzai school also adopted certain Taoist energy cultivation practices. They were introduced by Hakuin (1686–1769) who learned them from a hermit named Hakuyu. These energetic practices are called naikan. They are mainly based on focusing the mind and one's vital energy (ki) on the tanden (a spot slightly below the navel).

Certain Japanese arts such as painting, calligraphy, poetry, gardening, and the tea ceremony are also often used as methods of zen cultivation in rinzai. Hakuin is famously known for his sumi-e (ink and wash) paintings as well as for his calligraphy. Myōan Eisai is said to have popularized green tea in Japan and the famed master of Japanese tea, Sen no Rikyū (1522–1591), was also trained in rinzai.

Contemporary Rinzai schools

Rinzai Zen in Japan today is not a single organized body.  Rather, it is divided into 15 branches (or 16, if Ōbaku is included), referred to by the names of their head temples, of which half are based in Kyoto (8, plus Ōbaku). The largest and most influential of these is the Myōshin-ji branch, whose head temple was founded in 1342 by Kanzan Egen (1277–1360).  Other major branches include Nanzen-ji and Tenryū-ji (both founded by Musō Soseki), Daitoku-ji (founded by Shūhō Myōchō), and Tōfuku-ji (founded by Enni Ben'en, 1202–1280). These branches are purely organizational divisions arising from temple history and teacher-student lineage, and do not represent sectarian divides or fundamental differences in practice. There are nevertheless small differences in the way kōans are handled.

These head temples preside over various networks, comprising a total of approximately six thousand temples, forty monasteries, and one nunnery. The Myōshin-ji branch is by far the largest, approximately as big as the other branches combined: it contains within it about three thousand five hundred temples and nineteen monasteries.

Japanese Rinzai schools
The 15 branches of Rinzai, by head temple, are:

 Kennin-ji (1202)
 Tōfuku-ji (1236, founded by Enni Ben'en, 1202–1280)
 Kenchō-ji (1253)
 Engaku-ji (1282)
 Nanzen-ji (1291, founded by Musō Soseki)
 Kokutai-ji (1300)
 Daitoku-ji (1315, founded by Shūhō Myōchō)
 Kōgaku-ji (1380)
 Myōshin-ji (sect founded 1337, temple founded in 1342 by Kanzan Egen)
 Tenryū-ji (1339, founded by Musō Soseki)
 Eigen-ji (1361)
 Hōkō-ji (1384)
 Shōkoku-ji (1392)
 Buttsū-ji (1397, affiliated with Tenryū-ji until 1905)
 Kōshō-ji (1603)

Western Rinzai

A number of Rinzai lines have been transplanted from Japan to Europe, the Americas, and Australia, and non-Japanese practitioners have been certified as teachers and successors of those lineages. Rinzai temples, as well as practice groups led by lay practitioners, may now be found in many nations.

North American Rinzai centers include Rinzai-ji founded by Kyozan Joshu Sasaki Roshi and the Pacific Zen Institute founded by John Tarrant Roshi in California, Dai Bosatsu Zendo Kongo-ji established by Eido Shimano Roshi and Soen Nakagawa Roshi in New York, Chozen-ji founded by Omori Sogen Roshi in Hawaii, Daiyuzenji in Illinois and Korinji in Wisconsin both founded by dharma heirs in Omori Sogen Roshi's line, and Chobo-Ji founded by Genki Takabayshi Roshi in Seattle, Washington.   In Europe there is Havredal Zendo established by a Dharma Heir of Eido Shimano, Egmund Sommer (Denko Mortensen).

Related Japanese Zen schools

Obaku 

Aside from Rinzai and Sōtō, there is a third tradition of Zen present in Japan, the Ōbaku Zen sect. It was brought to Japan in the 17th century, and shows significant influence from the Pure Land school. This reflects the syncretistic tendencies that developed in Chinese Buddhism in the centuries after the earlier Rinzai lines had been transmitted to Japan.

Ōbaku is also descended from the Chinese Linji school, and so technically may be considered a part of the Japanese Rinzai movement; further, its abbots are now part of the same Ōtōkan lineage as Rinzai branches, though they were not so originally (instead following a more recent Chinese lineage). While Manpuku-ji, the Ōbaku headquarters temple, is considered one of the 15 Rinzai branches mentioned above, Ōbaku Zen is administratively separate from the other 14 branches and continues to maintain its own distinct identity.

Fuke 
A final Japanese Zen sect that self-identified as descending from the Linji school was the Fuke sect; Fuke Zen was suppressed with the Meiji Restoration in the 19th century and no longer exists.  Its influence on the development of music for the shakuhachi (bamboo flute), however, has been great.

Ichibata Yakushi Kyodan 

Ichibata Yakushi Kyodan (properly written Ichiba Yakushi Kyōdan 一畑薬師教団) is today generally considered an independent school of Buddhism, though it was previously associated with Myōshin-ji (and before that Tendai), and may still be considered part of Rinzai, though its practices and beliefs have little in common with Rinzai. It places great importance in faith in Yakushi (Medicine Buddha), and is known as a destination for healing.

Cultural influence
Remarkable results of the early relationship between Rinzai Zen and the ruling classes were a strong Rinzai influence on education and government, and Rinzai contributions to a great flowering of Japanese cultural arts such as calligraphy, painting, literature, tea ceremony, Japanese garden design, architecture and even martial arts.  A perhaps unanticipated result is that Soto Zen temples, with their connection and appeal to commoners, eventually came to outnumber Rinzai temples.

See also

Linji Yixuan
Zen
Ōbaku (school of Buddhism)
Hakuin Ekaku

References

Book references

Web references

Sources

External links
 Official site of The Joint Council for Japanese Rinzai and Obaku Zen (both Japanese and English language)
 The International Research Institute for Zen Buddhism, at Hanazono University (the Rinzai University) in Kyoto, Japan